Silab (also Romanized as Sīlāb) is a village in Koreh Soni Rural District of the Central District of Salmas County, West Azerbaijan province, Iran. At the 2006 National Census, its population was 3,652 in 794 households. The following census in 2011 counted 4,300 people in 1,043 households. The latest census in 2016 showed a population of 4,505 people in 1,085 households; it was the largest village in its rural district.

References 

Salmas County

Populated places in West Azerbaijan Province

Populated places in Salmas County